Alykes is a former municipality on the island of Zakynthos, Ionian Islands, Greece. Since the 2011 local government reform it is part of the municipality Zakynthos, of which it is a municipal unit. The seat of the municipality was in Katastari (pop. 1,378). The next largest towns in the municipality are Skoulikádo (pop. 653), Agios Dimitrios (531), Pigadákia (431), Alikanas (441), and Káto Gerakári (347).

Subdivisions
The municipal unit Alykes is subdivided into the following communities (constituent villages in brackets):
Agios Dimitrios (Agios Dimitrios, Drakas)
Alikanas
Ano Gerakari (Ano Gerakari, Alonia, Kastelia)
Katastari
Kallithea
Kato Gerakari
Meso Gerakari (Meso Gerakari, Psarou)
Pigadakia
Skoulikado

Population

References

External links 

Official website 

Populated places in Zakynthos